The 2018 Denver Broncos season was the franchise's 49th season in the National Football League and their 59th overall.

After poor offensive statistics that resulted in a 5–11 record during the previous season, the Broncos hoped for improvement at the quarterback position, with the offseason signing of Case Keenum as well as the breakthrough of undrafted rookie running back Phillip Lindsay. Another rookie that made an impact was linebacker Bradley Chubb, who recorded 12 sacks following a slow start. However, for a third consecutive season, the Broncos scored 30 or more points only once, and midway through the season, longtime wide receiver Demaryius Thomas was traded to the Houston Texans.

Following a 3–6 start, the Broncos put together a three-game winning streak, with hopes of turning their season around and competing for a playoff spot. However, key late-season injuries to cornerback Chris Harris Jr. (fractured fibula) and wide receiver Emmanuel Sanders (ruptured Achilles tendon) derailed those hopes, sending the Broncos to a season-ending four-game losing streak and a 6–10 record – only a one-win improvement from 2017.

The Broncos missed the playoffs for a third consecutive season, suffered back-to-back losing seasons for the first time since 1971–1972 and back-to-back double-digit losses for the first time since 1966–1967, resulting in the firing of head coach Vance Joseph at the end of the season. Joseph posted an 11–21 record in his two seasons as the Broncos' head coach. This was the third consecutive season with one game involving the Broncos getting at least 30 points.

This was also the 35th and final season under the ownership of Pat Bowlen, who died on June 13, 2019. This was also the Broncos' lone season playing at Broncos Stadium at Mile High.

Coaching changes
 January 1: One day after the 2017 regular season finale, the Broncos parted ways with six coaching assistants, firing special teams coordinator Brock Olivo, running backs/assistant head coach Eric Studesville, wide receivers coach Tyke Tolbert, outside linebackers coach Fred Pagac, defensive backs coach Johnnie Lynn and offensive line coach Jeff Davidson. Bill Musgrave, who was promoted to offensive coordinator midway through the 2017 season, shed the interim tag, and remained as the full-time offensive coordinator.
 January 3: Sean Kugler was hired as the new offensive line coach, replacing Jeff Davidson. Kugler, who will focus on the guards and centers, was the head coach at the University of Texas at El Paso from 2013 to 2017, and has previously served as an offensive line coach for the Detroit Lions (2004–2005), Buffalo Bills (2007–2009) and Pittsburgh Steelers (2010–2012).
 January 4: Mike Sullivan was hired as the new quarterbacks coach, while Curtis Modkins was hired as running backs coach. Sullivan was the New York Giants' quarterbacks coach and offensive coordinator during the previous three seasons (2015–2017), while Modkins served as the Chicago Bears' running backs coach in 2017. Klint Kubiak, who was promoted to quarterbacks coach after Bill Musgrave was promoted to offensive coordinator midway through the 2017 season, will remain on the Broncos' staff as an offensive assistant.
 January 9: Tom McMahon was hired as the new special teams coordinator. McMahon served in the same capacity with the Indianapolis Colts from 2014 to 2017.
 January 10: Chris Strausser was promoted from an offensive assistant to offensive line coach, and will focus on the tackles. Greg Williams was hired as a defensive backs coach, and will focus on the cornerbacks. Williams worked in the same capacity with the Indianapolis Colts during the previous two seasons. Zach Azzanni was hired as wide receivers coach. Azzanni worked in the same capacity with the Chicago Bears in 2017.
 June 13: DeMarcus Ware, a former Broncos' defensive lineman from 2014 to 2016, was hired as a part-time pass-rush consultant, and will tutor the Broncos' next crop of pass rushers.

Front office changes
On July 2, Tom Heckert Jr., who had worked as a director of pro personnel and senior personnel advisor since 2013, stepped down from his position due to health concerns and the expiration of his contract. Heckert was diagnosed with amyloidosis in 2015 and was placed on medical leave during the second half of that season. Heckert died on August 6, 2018, at the age of 51. Former Broncos' head coach Gary Kubiak remained as the team's lone senior personnel adviser until the end of the season.

Ownership sale
On March 21, 2018, the Broncos announced that John Bowlen, the brother of majority owner Pat Bowlen, agreed to sell a portion of his minority stake in the franchise back to the team. The statement released by the team said: "The Denver Broncos have reached an agreement to purchase a portion of minority owner John Bowlen's share of the team, pending final approval from the NFL that is expected in the next few days. This transaction further consolidates Pat Bowlen's majority, controlling ownership interest in the Broncos while keeping 100 percent of the team in the Bowlen family. The acquisition of this share is independent of Mr. Bowlen's succession plan that is being administered by the Pat Bowlen Trust. John has been a great partner for many years, and we are very pleased he will remain a minority owner of the Denver Broncos."

Roster changes

Free agents

Unrestricted

Restricted and Exclusive-Rights

Signings

Departures

Trades
 April 23, Punter Riley Dixon was traded to the New York Giants in exchange for a conditional 2019 draft selection.
 October 30: Wide receiver Demaryius Thomas was traded to the Houston Texans in exchange for the Texans' 2019 fourth-round selection; in addition, the teams will swap 2019 seventh-round selections. Thomas ranks third in franchise history in receptions (behind Shannon Sharpe and Rod Smith), second in receiving yards, touchdowns and single-season receptions (all behind Rod Smith), tied with Anthony Miller for the most touchdowns in a single season, and holds the franchise records for 100-yard receiving games and receiving yardage for both a single-game and a single-season.

Draft

Despite early reports that the Broncos would draft a quarterback, plus the draft of several offensive players, the Broncos stayed with Case Keenum, Paxton Lynch and Chad Kelly going into mini-camps.

Draft trades

Undrafted free agents

All undrafted free agents were signed after the 2018 NFL Draft concluded on April 28, unless noted otherwise.

Injuries
 May 30: Linebacker Deiontrez Mount ruptured his Achilles tendon during organized team activities (OTAs), and was ruled out for the  season. Mount was designated as waived/injured on June 14.
 August 13: Safety Jamal Carter was placed on injured reserve, after suffering a torn hamstring during the team's first preseason game against the Minnesota Vikings.
 August 20: Offensive tackle Menelik Watson was placed on injured reserve due to a chest injury, and was released once he was declared healthy.
 September 2: Safety Su'a Cravens was placed on injured reserve due to a knee injury, with the designation to return to the roster after eight weeks, and was reinstated to the active roster on November 2, two days ahead of the Broncos' Week 9 game vs. the Houston Texans.
 September 27: Tight end Jake Butt suffered a torn ACL in his left knee during practice, and was placed on the season-ending injured reserve. This was the third knee injury that Butt has suffered – he tore the ACL in his right knee twice while at the University of Michigan (2014 and 2016), and missed his entire rookie season in 2017 while rehabbing from the second knee injury.
 October 6: Punter Marquette King was placed on injured reserve due to a thigh injury, and was released on October 8.
 October 14: Guard Ronald Leary ruptured his Achilles tendon during the team's Week 6 loss to the Los Angeles Rams, and was placed on injured reserve.
 October 28: Linebacker Brandon Marshall suffered a knee injury during the team's Week 8 loss to the Kansas City Chiefs, and returned to practice on November 28.
 November 4: Center Matt Paradis suffered a broken leg during the team's Week 9 loss to the Houston Texans, and was placed on injured reserve one week later, during the team's Week 10 bye.
 November 16: Guard Max Garcia suffered a torn ACL during practice – two days ahead of the team's Week 11 win over the Los Angeles Chargers, and was placed on injured reserve four days later (November 20).
 November 25: During the team's Week 12 win over the Pittsburgh Steelers, linebacker Shaquil Barrett sustained a tear in his hip flexor, and missed a few weeks. Also in Week 12, tight end Jeff Heuerman suffered three broken ribs and a bruised lung, and was placed on injured reserve two days later.
 December 2: Cornerback Chris Harris, Jr. suffered a broken fibula during the team's Week 13 win over the Cincinnati Bengals. He was not initially placed on injured reserve, and hoped to return to action if the Broncos had made the playoffs. However, after the Broncos were eliminated from postseason contention in Week 15, Harris was officially placed on injured reserve on December 19.
 December 5: Wide receiver Emmanuel Sanders ruptured his Achilles tendon during practice, and was placed on injured reserve.
 December 28: Running back Phillip Lindsay (wrist) and wide receiver Andre Holmes (ankle) were both injured during the team's Week 16 loss to the Oakland Raiders, and were placed on injured reserve ahead of the Broncos' final season game.

Staff

Final roster

Preseason

Regular season

Schedule

Note: Intra-division opponents are in bold text.

Game summaries

Week 1: vs. Seattle Seahawks

For an eighth consecutive year, the Broncos kicked off the season at home, with the Seahawks as their Week 1 opponent. Following an interception of Broncos' quarterback Case Keenum by Seahawks' safety Earl Thomas midway through the first quarter, quarterback Russell Wilson connected with tight end Will Dissly on a 15-yard touchdown pass. The Broncos responded on their next possession, with Keenum throwing a 29-yard touchdown pass to running back Phillip Lindsay. After a 35-yard field goal by placekicker Sebastian Janikowski gave the Seahawks a 10–7 lead early in the second quarter, the Broncos claimed the lead with a 43-yard touchdown pass from Keenum to wide receiver Emmanuel Sanders. A 51-yard field goal by placekicker Brandon McManus later in the second quarter increased the Broncos' lead to 17–10. At the two-minute warning, Janikowski missed wide left on a 51-yard field goal, however, he got a second chance as the result of an offsides penalty on Broncos' cornerback Tramaine Brock. Janikowski missed wide left again on the second attempt – from 46 yards out. Three plays later, the Broncos' reached the Seahawks' 26-yard line, and were hoping to increase their lead heading into halftime, however, Keenum was intercepted by safety Bradley McDougald.

Following an exchange of turnovers midway through the third quarter – a fumble recovery by Broncos' linebacker Von Miller off Seahawks' running back Chris Carson and another interception of Keenum by McDougald, the Seahawks pulled even, with Wilson connecting with wide receiver Brandon Marshall on a 20-yard touchdown pass. Following an interception of Wilson by Broncos' safety Justin Simmons, a 53-yard field goal by McManus later in the third quarter gave the Broncos a 20–17 lead. On the second play of the fourth quarter, the Seahawks reclaimed the lead, with Wilson launching a 51-yard touchdown pass to wide receiver Tyler Lockett. The Broncos then drove 75 yards in seven plays, culminating in Keenum's third touchdown pass of the game – a 4-yarder to wide receiver Demaryius Thomas in the corner of the end zone with 11:18 remaining in the game. The play was reviewed by instant replay, but was upheld as the result of Demaryius Thomas keeping both of his toes in the end zone. Both teams punted on their next two possessions, and after the Seahawks were forced to burn all three of their team timeouts, they had one last possession with 1:01 remaining in the game, however, Wilson was intercepted by cornerback Adam Jones at the Seahawks' 40-yard line, ending the game.

Week 2: vs. Oakland Raiders

The Broncos' offense went three-and-out on four of their six first half possessions. They reached the Raiders' 18-yard line on their fifth possession, which was aided by a 53-yard run by running back Phillip Lindsay, however, a pass attempt by quarterback Case Keenum intended for tight end Jake Butt near the goal line was intercepted by Raiders' cornerback Rashaan Melvin. The Raiders took a 12–0 lead on a pair of field goals by placekicker Mike Nugent – a 26-yarder on the opening drive followed by a 46-yarder early in the second quarter – and a 1-yard touchdown run by running back Marshawn Lynch just before halftime. The extra-point attempt on the Lynch touchdown was blocked by Broncos' linebacker Shaquil Barrett.

The Broncos got on the scoreboard on the opening possession of the second half, with a 1-yard touchdown run by running back Royce Freeman. The drive was kept alive by an unsportsmanlike conduct penalty on Raiders' linebacker Bruce Irvin, after the Raiders' defense had stopped the Broncos on third down at the 9-yard line. The Raiders responded on their next possession, with a 20-yard touchdown pass from quarterback Derek Carr to wide receiver Seth Roberts at the 5:31 mark of the third quarter. The Raiders were held scoreless for the remainder of the game, and the Broncos pulled to within a 19–10 deficit, with a 39-yard field goal by placekicker Brandon McManus. The Raiders then drove to the Broncos' 33-yard line, and faced a 4th-and-1, however, instead of kicking a long field goal, the Raiders opted for a short pass from Carr to fullback Keith Smith, which fell incomplete. The Broncos then assembled a 14-play, 67-yard drive, with Keenum diving for a 1-yard touchdown on a 4th-and-goal quarterback draw, narrowing the Raiders' lead to 19–17 with 6:02 remaining in the game. Keenum's run was reviewed, but upheld by instant replay. The Raiders gained two first downs, reached midfield and forced the Broncos to burn the last two of their three team timeouts, but were forced to punt just before the two-minute warning. Following an offensive holding penalty that drove the Broncos back to their own 10-yard line, Keenum engineered a 10-play, 62-yard drive, culminating in McManus kicking a game-winning 36-yard field goal with only 10 seconds left. The drive was keyed by a 26-yard completion from Keenum to wide receiver Tim Patrick, who evaded tackles by Raiders' cornerbacks Gareon Conley and Leon Hall, who unsuccessfully tried to keep Patrick from scampering out of bounds with both teams out of timeouts. The Broncos' defense thwarted the Raiders' last desperation play of the game.

Notes

Week 3: at Baltimore Ravens

In their first road game of the season, the Broncos were plagued by several penalties, in a 27–14 loss at the Baltimore Ravens. After Ravens' punter Sam Koch has his punt blocked by Joseph Jones on the opening possession of the game, the Broncos grabbed the early lead on the next play, with a 6-yard touchdown run by running back Royce Freeman. The Ravens countered, with running back Alex Collins rushing for a 6-yard touchdown. The drive started at the Broncos' 48-yard line, after Broncos' cornerback Isaac Yiadom was flagged for an unnecessary roughness penalty while on the sidelines. The Broncos grabbed a 14–7 lead on their next possession, with a 35-yard touchdown run by wide receiver Emmanuel Sanders on an end-around. However, the Broncos were held scoreless for the remainder of the game. The Ravens pulled to within a 14–10 deficit late in the first quarter, with a 52-yard field goal by placekicker Justin Tucker, and took the lead for good midway through the second quarter, with a 12-yard touchdown pass from quarterback Joe Flacco to running back Javorius Allen. The play was initially ruled down at the 1-yard line, but changed by instant replay. After the Broncos went three-and-out, the Ravens were attempting to add to their lead, but Tucker's 43-yard field goal attempt was blocked by Justin Simmons and recovered by Chris Harris, Jr., who scampered down the sideline for a touchdown. However, Harris' touchdown was nullified by an illegal block penalty on the return by Billy Turner, pushing back the first play of scrimmage of the Broncos' next drive back to near midfield. Three plays later, the Broncos reached the Ravens' 25-yard line, however, on the fourth play, Ravens' linebacker Terrell Suggs forced a fumble off Broncos' quarterback Case Keenum, and running back Phillip Lindsay was ejected from the game just before the two-minute warning for unsportsmanlike conduct while trying to recover the fumble. This pushed the Broncos out of field goal range, and another field 52-yard field goal by Tucker gave the Ravens a 20–14 lead at halftime.

The Ravens added to their lead on their first possession of the second half, with a 1-yard run by Allen, which was the final scoring play of the game. The drive was aided by a defensive offsides penalty on Broncos' defensive end Derek Wolfe on a 3rd-and-4. The Broncos committed three costly penalties on their next drive – offensive holding on Garett Bolles that negated a 39-yard pass completion from Keenum to wide receiver Demaryius Thomas at the Ravens' 11-yard line, a holding call on Connor McGovern at the Ravens' 31-yard line and an unnecessary roughness flag on Ronald Leary that pushed the Broncos out of field goal range. The Broncos reached the Ravens' 5-yard line on their first possession of the fourth quarter, but Keenum was intercepted by Patrick Onwuasor, who ran 89 yards for a touchdown. However, the touchdown was nullified by an illegal block on the return. The Broncos had one more possession, but turned the football over on downs with three minutes remaining in the game, and the Ravens ran out the clock.

Week 4: vs. Kansas City Chiefs

After an exchange of field goals in the first quarter – a 42-yarder by Broncos placekicker Brandon McManus and a 33-yarder by Chiefs' placekicker Harrison Butker, Chiefs' quarterback Patrick Mahomes scrambled for an 8-yard touchdown and Broncos' running back Royce Freeman ran for a 14-yard touchdown – both midway through the second quarter. A 34-yard field goal by McManus just before halftime gave the Broncos a 13–10 lead. A 21-yard field goal by Butker on the Chiefs' opening possession of the second half tied the game. A 1-yard touchdown run by running back Phillip Lindsay later in the third quarter, coupled with a 46-yard field goal by McManus early in the fourth quarter gave the Broncos a 23–13 lead. Mahomes then engineered a 12-play, 75-yard drive, culminating in a 2-yard touchdown pass to tight end Travis Kelce to narrow the Broncos lead to 23–20 with 6:30 remaining in the game. After the Broncos went three-and-out, the Chiefs grabbed a 27–23 lead, with a 4-yard touchdown pass to running back Kareem Hunt. The drive featured a critical third-down conversion, in which Mahomes threw left-handed to wide receiver Tyreek Hill while being pursued out of bounds by Broncos' linebackers Von Miller and Shane Ray. The drive was also marred with controversy, in which the Broncos claimed that the referees missed a delay-of-game call on a critical third-down play. With 1:39 remaining in the game and no timeouts, the Broncos attempted a rally, and reached the Chiefs' 28-yard line with 32 seconds remaining after a 36-yard completion from quarterback Case Keenum to tight end Jeff Heuerman. On the next play, Keenum overthrew wide receiver Demaryius Thomas down the sideline on a potential game-winning touchdown. With 16 seconds left, and facing a 4th-and-10, Keenum completed a pass to wide receiver Courtland Sutton, and Sutton attempted a hook-and-lateral, which was fumbled and recovered by Chiefs' defensive end Justin Houston, but ruled incomplete after instant replay, ending the Broncos' rally attempt.

Notes

This was the first of two games in which the Broncos wore their alternate navy blue jerseys – the other was Week 15 vs. the Cleveland Browns.

Week 5: at New York Jets

After forcing a fumble on the Jets' opening drive, the Broncos took the early lead, with an 8-yard touchdown pass from quarterback Case Keenum to wide receiver Courtland Sutton. However, the Jets took control of the game in the second quarter. The Broncos' defense allowed Jets' running back Isaiah Crowell to rush for 219 yards, including a 77-yard touchdown, and quarterback Sam Darnold threw three touchdown passes – including a 76-yarder to wide receiver Robby Anderson. From the second quarter onward, the Broncos' offense only managed a 30-yard field goal by placekicker Brandon McManus and a 42-yard touchdown pass from Keenum to wide receiver Demaryius Thomas – the latter of which occurred after the game had been decided in the Jets' favor.

Week 6: vs. Los Angeles Rams

The Rams took an early 6–0 lead, with a pair of field goals by placekicker Cairo Santos – a 26- and a 39-yarder. Near the end of the first quarter, quarterback Case Keenum completed what was initially ruled as a 44-yard touchdown pass to wide receiver Emmanuel Sanders, who was immediately flagged for a taunting penalty against Rams' cornerback Troy Hill, which would have been penalized on the kickoff. However, instant replay determined that Sanders was ruled down at the 1-yard line by contact, where the unsportsmanlike conduct penalty was assessed. The Broncos were forced to settle for a 28-yard field goal by placekicker Brandon McManus. A 10-yard touchdown run by Rams' running back Todd Gurley was the only scoring play of the second quarter. The Broncos reached the Rams' 28-yard line on the first possession of the second quarter, only to have a holding penalty on offensive tackle Garett Bolles push them out of field goal range. Following an exchange of punts to start the second half, the Rams increased their lead to 20–3, with a 1-yard run by Gurley. On the Rams' next possession, quarterback Jared Goff was intercepted by Broncos' safety Darian Stewart on a deflected pass deep in Rams' territory, and two plays later, Keenum connected with Sanders on a 22-yard touchdown pass near the end of the third quarter. After forcing a Rams' punt, the Broncos reached the 6-yard line, but were forced to settle for a 24-yard field goal by McManus at the 8:57 mark of the fourth quarter. The Broncos' defense prevented the Rams defense from reaching the end zone, however, Santos responded with a 21-yard field goal to give the Rams a 23–13 lead with 3:19 remaining. Without any timeouts, the Broncos reached the end zone in nine plays, and pulled to within a 23–20 deficit, with a 1-yard touchdown pass from Keenum to wide receiver Demaryius Thomas with 1:27 remaining in the game. However, the onside kick attempt was unsuccessful, and the Rams ran out the clock.

Week 7: at Arizona Cardinals

The Broncos' defense returned two interceptions off Cardinals' quarterback Josh Rosen for touchdowns in the first quarter – one by linebacker Todd Davis and the other by cornerback Chris Harris, Jr., and wide receiver Emmanuel Sanders received and threw a touchdown pass, in a 45–10 rout of the Cardinals. Running backs Royce Freeman and Phillip Lindsay each rushed for a touchdown, and after surrendering a combined 593 rushing yards in their previous two games against the Los Angeles Rams and New York Jets, the Broncos' defense allowed only 69 rushing yards.

Notes

The Broncos improved their all-time series record against the Cardinals to 9–1–1. This was the only game during the  season in which the Broncos scored 30 or more points.

Week 8: at Kansas City Chiefs

For the second time in the month of October, the Broncos faced their AFC West rival Kansas City Chiefs. A 1-yard touchdown run by running back Phillip Lindsay gave the Broncos the early lead. The Chiefs got on the board, with a 24-yard field goal by placekicker Harrison Butker, a drive that was aided by a defensive pass interference penalty on Broncos cornerback Bradley Roby on a 3rd-and-19. Broncos' placekicker Brandon McManus missed wide right on a 55-yard field goal attempt, one play after wide receiver Emmanuel Sanders was tackled for a 6-yard loss on an end-around. The Chiefs took the lead in the second quarter with two touchdown passes by quarterback Patrick Mahomes – a 9-yarder to tight end Travis Kelce and a 13-yarder to wide receiver Sammy Watkins – the latter with a missed extra point attempt. The Broncos pulled to within a 16–14 deficit just before halftime, with quarterback Case Keenum connecting with wide receiver Tim Patrick on a 24-yard touchdown pass. The Chiefs then increased their lead to 30–14 on their first two possessions of the second half, with two more touchdown passes by Mahomes – a 10-yarder to Watkins, followed by a 23-yarder to running back Kareem Hunt.

On the first play of the fourth quarter, the Broncos responded, with Keenum throwing a 4-yard touchdown pass to tight end Jeff Heuerman. However, the two-point conversion attempt was unsuccessful, which would have pulled the Broncos to within a one-score deficit. The Broncos' defense forced a turnover on the Chiefs' next possession, with safety Justin Simmons intercepting a pass from Mahomes at the Broncos' 39-yard line. However, four plays later, after the Broncos had reached the Chiefs' 39-yard line, Keenum was strip-sacked by Dee Ford, with Chiefs' linebacker Breeland Speaks recovering the fumble. The Broncos' defense forced a Chiefs punt, however, on the next possession, Keenum was intercepted by cornerback Kendall Fuller near midfield. Following an exchange of punts, and after burning two of their three team timeouts, the Broncos drove 46 yards in ten plays, with a 36-yard field goal by McManus pulling the Broncos to within a 30–23 deficit just after the two-minute warning. The Broncos' defense forced a three-and-out from the Chiefs, and the Broncos had one last offensive play, however, with only four seconds left and no timeouts, their last desperation play of the game was unsuccessful.

Notes

The Broncos lost their seventh consecutive game against the Chiefs – surpassing the team's longest losing skid against the Chiefs since a six-game streak from 1970 to 1973.

Week 9: vs. Houston Texans

The Texans took the lead on their game's opening drive, with a 7-yard touchdown pass from quarterback Deshaun Watson to tight end Jordan Thomas. A 44-yard field goal by Broncos' placekicker Brandon McManus put the Broncos on the scoreboard. However, after running back Devontae Booker lost a fumble deep in Broncos' territory early in the second quarter, the Texans capitalized, with Watson connecting with wide receiver DeAndre Hopkins on a 16-yard touchdown (with a missed extra point attempt). Following an exchange of punts, Booker redeemed himself, with a 14-yard touchdown run. With only 22 seconds remaining in the first half, McManus missed wide right on a 62-yard field goal attempt, giving the Texans a short field and an opportunity to score. Broncos' head coach Vance Joseph attempted to ice Texans' placekicker Ka'imi Fairbairn prior to attempting a half-ending 46-yard field. The initial attempt missed wide right, however, Fairbairn's second attempt was successful, giving the Texans a 16–10 lead. The Broncos took their first and only lead of the game, with quarterback Case Keenum throwing a 12-yard touchdown pass to tight end Jeff Heuerman, which was the only scoring play of the third quarter. The Texans reclaimed the lead early in the fourth quarter, with a 37-yard field goal by Fairbairn. The drive was extended as the result of a defensive holding penalty on Broncos' safety Su'a Cravens on a third-down play. Following an exchange of punts, the Broncos, trailing 19–17, had one last offensive possession, and reached the Texans' 33-yard line, however, McManus missed wide right on a 51-yard field goal as time expired.

Notes

Wide receiver Demaryius Thomas, who was traded by the Broncos to the Texans earlier in the week, made his debut in a Texans' uniform.

Week 11: at Los Angeles Chargers

A pair of first quarter field goals by placekicker Michael Badgley – from 46 and 45 yards out – gave the Chargers the early lead. The Broncos grabbed the lead early in the second quarter, with a 41-yard touchdown run by running back Phillip Lindsay. On the next possession, Chargers' quarterback Philip Rivers was intercepted by cornerback Chris Harris, Jr., giving the Broncos the football near midfield. However, on the fifth play of the drive, the Broncos opted to convert a 4th-and-1 at the Chargers' 16-yard line instead of kicking a field goal, but Lindsay was stopped for no gain. The Chargers regained the lead on their next possession, with Rivers connecting on a 4-yard touchdown pass to wide receiver Keenan Allen, one play after Rivers was nearly intercepted in the end zone on a deflected pass.

The Chargers took the opening possession of the second half and added to their lead, with Rivers throwing his second touchdown pass – a 6-yarder to tight end Antonio Gates. However, Badgley missed wide left on the extra point attempt, keeping the score at 19–7. The Broncos went three and out on their first offensive possession of the second half, and the Chargers were attempting to pull away from the Broncos on their next possession. However, as the Chargers reached the Broncos' 35-yard line, Rivers was intercepted by linebacker Von Miller on a screen pass attempt, and Miller returned the interception to the Chargers' 18-yard line. The Broncos capitalized three plays later, with running back Royce Freeman rushing for a three-yard touchdown.

After forcing a three-and-out from the Chargers, the Broncos took a 20–19 lead early in the fourth quarter, with Lindsay rushing for a 2-yard touchdown on a direct snap. Quarterback Case Keenum's two-point attempt was unsuccessful, as he was stopped just short of the goal line. The Chargers then drove to the Broncos' 12-yard line in eight plays, and a 30-yard field goal by Badgley gave the Chargers a 22–20 lead with 6:51 remaining in the game. The Broncos were attempting a rally, and reached the Chargers' 45-yard line with four minutes remaining in the game, but were forced to punt. The possession was extended by a fumble from wide receiver Emmanuel Sanders that was reversed by instant replay and ruled as an incomplete pass, as well as a Keenum interception that was nullified by a defensive holding penalty on Chargers' safety Jahleel Addae. The Chargers got the football back, and attempted to run out the clock after gaining one first down and forcing the Broncos to burn all of their timeouts, but were forced to punt just after the two-minute warning. With 1:51 remaining in the game and the Broncos backed up to their own 8-yard line, Keenum engineered a 7-play, 76-yard drive, culminating in placekicker Brandon McManus kicking a game-winning 34-yard field goal as time expired. The Chargers unsuccessfully tried to ice McManus, calling a timeout prior to McManus' first attempt.

Week 12: vs. Pittsburgh Steelers

The Broncos donned their orange color rush uniforms in the Week 12 matchup against the Pittsburgh Steelers, who were victimized by several missed scoring opportunities. On the Steelers' first possession, placekicker Chris Boswell's 48-yard field goal attempt was blocked by Justin Simmons. The Broncos took the early lead, with a 41-yard field goal by placekicker Brandon McManus – the only scoring play of the first quarter. The Steelers then drove down the field, attempting to take their first lead, with quarterback Ben Roethlisberger completing a pass to tight end Xavier Grimble along the sidelines. However, Broncos' safety Will Parks forced a fumble just before Grimble reached the goal line, with the football going out of the end zone for a touchback. Following a Broncos' punt, Boswell atoned for his earlier blocked field goal attempt, with a 41-yard field goal. The first touchdown of the game came courtesy of a 10-yard touchdown pass from Broncos' quarterback Case Keenum to tight end Matt LaCosse at the 3:33 mark of the second quarter. The Steelers then marched down the field, and were attempting a 19-yard field goal attempt to close out the first half, however, the Steelers' special teams caught the Broncos off-guard, with a 2-yard touchdown from Boswell to Alejandro Villanueva on a fake field goal pass to tie the game at 10–10.

Following an exchange of punts to begin the second half, the Steelers grabbed their first (and only) lead of the game, with Roethlisberger launching a 97-yard touchdown pass to wide receiver JuJu Smith-Schuster. Following a three-and-out from the Broncos, the Steelers were attempting to add to their lead, however, Roethlisberger was intercepted by cornerback Chris Harris, Jr. The Broncos capitalized two plays later, with Keenum connecting with wide receiver Emmanuel Sanders on a 5-yard touchdown to tie the game at 17–17. Following another exchange of punts, the Steelers reached the Broncos' 23-yard line, however, Broncos' cornerback Bradley Roby forced a fumble off Steelers' running back James Conner near the end of the third quarter. The Broncos once again capitalized, with an 11-play, 79-yard drive, culminating in a 2-yard touchdown run by running back Phillip Lindsay. This gave the Broncos a 24–17 lead at the 9:22 mark of the fourth quarter. Both teams punted on their next possession, and the Steelers, with only one timeout, had one last offensive possession with 4:26 remaining in the game. Just before the two-minute warning, the Steelers reached the Broncos' 3-yard line, with a first-and-goal. However, on the third play after the two-minute warning, Roethlisberger's short pass intended for wide receiver Antonio Brown was intercepted by linebacker Shelby Harris for a touchback – the Steelers' fourth turnover of the game – to seal the win for the Broncos.

Week 13: at Cincinnati Bengals

Neither team advanced past their opponent's 43-yard line through their first three possessions, until the Broncos' fourth possession, in which placekicker Brandon McManus missed wide left on a 50-yard field goal attempt. The first points of the game came courtesy of a 6-yard touchdown run by Broncos' running back Phillip Lindsay at the two-minute warning. The Bengals then drove down the field, however, the Broncos' defense limited the Bengals to a 35-yard field goal by placekicker Randy Bullock just before halftime. Following an exchange of punts to begin the second half, the Broncos increased their lead, with quarterback Case Keenum connecting with wide receiver Courtland Sutton on a 30-yard touchdown pass. The Bengals reached the Broncos' 30-yard line on their second possession of the second half, however quarterback Jeff Driskel, playing in place of the injured Andy Dalton, was intercepted by cornerback Justin Simmons at the 7-yard line. The Broncos capitalized four plays later, with Lindsay rushing for a 65-yard touchdown. The Bengals responded, with Driskel throwing a 30-yard touchdown pass to wide receiver Cody Core to narrow the Broncos' lead to 21–10. Despite a lost fumble by Broncos' running back Royce Freeman near midfield toward the end of the third quarter, the Bengals' offense did not advance past the Broncos' 47-yard line for the remainder of the game. With 2:49 remaining in the game, linebacker Bradley Chubb forced a fumble off Driskel, and with the Bengals out of timeouts, a 29-yard field goal by McManus with only 27 seconds left put the game out of reach.

Week 14: at San Francisco 49ers

The Broncos fell behind 20–0 at halftime, and the defense allowed 210 receiving yards to 49ers' tight end George Kittle – 85 of which came on one play, which resulted in a 49ers' touchdown. Placekicker Robbie Gould added two field goals – a 40-yarder in the first quarter followed by a 29-yarder in the second quarter, and quarterback Nick Mullens also threw a 1-yard touchdown pass to wide receiver Dante Pettis. The Broncos' offense accumulated only 70 total yards on their first six possessions (excluding a kneel down before halftime), went 2-for-15 on third down conversions and running back Phillip Lindsay, who rushed for 157 yards against the Bengals during the previous week, was held to just 30 yards rushing. The Broncos finally got on the scoreboard at the six-minute mark of the third quarter, with a 3-yard rushing touchdown by Lindsay. The Broncos' offense failed on two 4th-down conversions on their next two possessions, and with only 3:57 remaining in the game, a 1-yard touchdown pass from quarterback Case Keenum to wide receiver DaeSean Hamilton pulled the Broncos to within a 20–14 deficit. However, the Broncos' defense was unable to prevent Mullens from converting two crucial third-down pass completions prior to the two-minute warning, forcing the Broncos to burn two timeouts – the other timeout was lost another on an unsuccessful challenge, and leaving the Broncos with only eight seconds for one last desperation pass play, which was snuffed out by the 49ers' defense.

Week 15: vs. Cleveland Browns

The Cleveland Browns took the early lead, with quarterback Baker Mayfield launching a 31-yard touchdown pass to wide receiver Breshad Perriman. After going three-and-out on their first two possessions, the Broncos got on the scoreboard later in the first quarter, with quarterback Case Keenum rushing for a 1-yard touchdown, then grabbed the lead midway through the second quarter, with a 44-yard field goal by placekicker Brandon McManus. Cleveland responded on their next possession, with a 40-yard field goal by placekicker Greg Joseph. The Broncos were attempting to re-take the lead on their next possession, reaching the Cleveland 29-yard line, however Keenum was intercepted by Cleveland safety Jabrill Peppers in the end zone for a touchback. The Broncos' defense subsequently returned the favor, as Cleveland reached the Broncos' 30-yard line just before halftime, however, Mayfield was intercepted by safety Dymonte Thomas near the goal line. After forcing a fumble off Mayfield, a 42-yard field goal by McManus gave the Broncos a 13–10 lead late in the third quarter.

After forcing a Cleveland punt, Keenum was intercepted by cornerback T. J. Carrie at the Broncos' 48-yard line on the second play of the fourth quarter. Six plays later, Cleveland capitalized and took a 17–13 lead, with a 2-yard touchdown pass from Mayfield to wide receiver Antonio Callaway. With 11:49 left in the game, the Broncos drove 64 yards in 13 plays, and instead of trying to convert a 4th-and-1 at the Cleveland 6-yard line, they elected for a 29-yard field goal by McManus to pull within a 17–16 deficit with 4:39 left. Cleveland drove down to the Broncos' 10-yard line and forced the Broncos to use the last two of their three team timeouts. However, instead of trying to increase their lead with a field goal, Cleveland attempted to run out the clock, but running back Nick Chubb was stopped for a 2-yard loss on a 4th-and-1 at the Broncos' 12-yard line. The Broncos reached midfield with 1:12 remaining in the game, however, after Keenum spiked the football on first down and two incomplete passes, Keenum was sacked by Peppers to end the Broncos' rally attempt.

Notes

This was the Cleveland Browns' first victory over the Broncos since 1990, snapping an 11-game losing streak to the Broncos. The Broncos own a 23–6 all-time record vs. Cleveland (including the playoffs). The Broncos wore their alternate navy blue jerseys for this game. This game featured Broncos' linebacker Bradley Chubb playing against his cousin, Cleveland running back Nick Chubb. With the loss, coupled with the Tennessee Titans' victory over the New York Giants the following day, the Broncos were officially eliminated from postseason contention.

Week 16: at Oakland Raiders

The Broncos fell behind 17–0 by halftime to the Raiders – the second time in three weeks in which they were shutout in the first half. On their first possession, the Broncos punted, and cornerback Isaac Yiadom failed to down the punt neat the goal line. Raiders' return specialist Dwayne Harris took advantage of Yiadom's blunder by returning the football 99 yards for a touchdown. The Raiders later increased their lead to 17–0 in the second quarter, with a 24-yard touchdown run by running back Doug Martin and a 43-yard field goal by placekicker Daniel Carlson. The Broncos' offense failed to advance past the Raiders' 45-yard line on their first five drives, and on their sixth drive, placekicker Brandon McManus missed short on a 58-yard field goal attempt just before halftime. The Broncos finally got on the scoreboard at the 4:40 mark of the third quarter, with a 7-yard touchdown pass from quarterback Case Keenum to wide receiver DaeSean Hamilton, which was the only scoring play of the third quarter. The Raiders responded, with a 12-play, 72-yard drive that consumed 7:20, culminating in a 3-yard touchdown run by running back Jalen Richard early in the fourth quarter. The Broncos once again pulled to within a 10–point deficit, with Keenum throwing his second touchdown of the second half – a 19-yarder to wide receiver Courtland Sutton. The touchdown was disputed by the Raiders' bench – thinking that Keenum had crossed the line of scrimmage prior to the pass. After forcing a three-and-out, the Broncos were attempting a rally, however, Keenum was intercepted by safety Marcus Gilchrist, and a 45-yard field goal by Carlson increased the Raiders' lead to 27–14 with 4:42 remaining in the game. Without any timeouts, the Broncos had one last possession, however, Keenum was intercepted again – this time by safety Erik Harris, which ended the Broncos' rally attempt. With the loss, the Broncos clinched back-to-back losing seasons for the first time since 1971–1972.

Week 17: vs. Los Angeles Chargers

The Broncos hosted the Los Angeles Chargers in the 2018 regular season finale. Chargers' quarterback Philip Rivers was intercepted twice by the Broncos' defense in the first quarter, however, the Broncos failed to capitalize both times. After a scoreless first quarter, Chargers' linebacker Kyle Emanuel recovered a fumble off a lateral pass and fumble by Broncos' quarterback Case Keenum for an 18-yard touchdown. The Broncos reached the red zone just before halftime, but were forced to settle on a 28-yard field goal by placekicker Brandon McManus. The Broncos got a reprieve after Keenum was intercepted by safety Jahleel Addae in the end zone, who lost the fumble on the runback and was recovered by offensive tackle Elijah Wilkinson. The Chargers increased their lead late in the third quarter, with a 3-yard touchdown pass from Rivers to wide receiver Mike Williams. The Broncos pulled to within a 14–9 deficit early in the fourth quarter, with Keenum connecting on a 20-yard touchdown pass to fullback Andy Janovich. The Broncos attempted a two-point conversion, hoping to pull to within a three-point deficit, however, Keenum was intercepted by linebacker Casey Hayward three yards deep in the end zone, who ran down the field 103 yards for a defensive two-point conversion. The Chargers responded and increased their lead to 23–9, with a 1-yard touchdown run by running back Austin Ekeler with six minutes remaining in the game. The Broncos had one last offensive possession and reached the Chargers' 31-yard line, but turned the football over on downs just before the two-minute warning.

Notes

One day after the game (December 31), Vance Joseph was fired after posting an 11–21 record in his two seasons as the Broncos' head coach.

Standings

Division

Conference

Statistics

Team leaders

League rankings

Records and milestones
 Week 2: Running back Phillip Lindsay, a Denver native, became the first undrafted free agent in NFL history to achieve 100-plus scrimmage yards in his first two games.
 Week 7: Wide receiver Demaryius Thomas reached 9,000 career receiving yards.
 Week 11: Linebacker Von Miller reached 100 career sacks and became the fifth-fastest to do so since . Miller also reached 10 sacks on the season, becoming only the third defensive lineman in NFL history to achieve double-digit sack seasons within their first eight years, joining Reggie White and DeMarcus Ware.
 Week 14: Linebacker Bradley Chubb reached 12.5 sacks, setting a new franchise record for sacks by a rookie, surpassing the previous record of 11.5 sacks that was set by Rulon Jones (1980) and Von Miller (2011).
 Week 15: Von Miller became the Broncos' all-time leader in sacks, surpassing Simon Fletcher.
Lindsay also become the first Broncos' rookie to rush for 1,000 yards since Clinton Portis in 2002.

Awards and honors

Pro Bowl and All-Pro selections
Linebacker Von Miller and running back Phillip Lindsay were selected to the 2019 Pro Bowl, while linebacker Bradley Chubb, cornerback Chris Harris, Jr. and wide receiver Emmanuel Sanders were named as alternates. Miller was also voted to the  All-Pro Team and named to the Second Team. Lindsay became the first undrafted rookie in NFL history to earn a Pro Bowl selection, however, due to a wrist injury that he suffered during the Broncos' second-to-last game of the season, Lindsay did not play in the Pro Bowl, and served as an NFL social media correspondent instead. Sanders did not participate due to a ruptured Achilles tendon that ended his season on December 5.

On January 16, 2019, Casey Kreiter was selected as the first long snapper to ever be selected to a Pro Bowl. Five days later, Harris was selected to the Pro Bowl roster as a replacement for New England Patriots' cornerback Stephon Gilmore. Harris was declared healthy after suffering a broken fibula that forced him to miss the Broncos' last four games of the season.

Other news and notes
On June 20, the Broncos reached a temporary naming rights agreement for their home stadium. Colorado-based sporting goods retailer Sports Authority previously held the naming rights for the Broncos' stadium from 2011 to 2017, despite going bankrupt in 2016. Shortly after the end of the 2017 season, the Broncos removed the old signage from the exterior of their stadium – formerly known as "Sports Authority Field at Mile High," and previously known as "Invesco Field at Mile High" from 2001 to 2010. For the 2018 season, the official name, which was approved by the Metropolitan Football Stadium District board, was known as "Broncos Stadium at Mile High," until the team came to terms on a new naming rights deal just before the start of the 2019 season, renaming the Broncos' home field as Empower Field at Mile High.

References

External links
 
 The Denver Post – Complete Broncos Coverage 
 NFL Nation Blog – ESPN

Denver
Denver Broncos seasons
Denver Broncos